A Muppet Family Christmas is a Christmas television special starring Jim Henson's Muppets. It first aired on December 16, 1987, on the ABC television network in the United States.

Shot in Toronto, Ontario, Canada, its teleplay was conceived by longtime Muppet writer Jerry Juhl, and directed by Peter Harris and Eric Till (the latter of whom was uncredited). The special features various Muppets from The Muppet Show, Sesame Street, Fraggle Rock, and Muppet Babies. It also stars Gerard Parkes as Doc from the North American wraparound segments of Fraggle Rock, and Henson as himself in a cameo appearance at the end. In the plot, the Muppets surprise Fozzie Bear's mother with a Christmas visit to her farmhouse, unaware of her planned getaway to Malibu.

Due to licensing issues with songs featured in A Muppet Family Christmas, some scenes have been cut from subsequent home media releases.

Plot
Fozzie Bear is driving many of the Muppets to his mother Emily's farm for Christmas while they all sing "We Need a Little Christmas". Unbeknownst to Fozzie, Emily Bear is preparing to go to Malibu for the holiday and rent her farmhouse to Doc and Sprocket, who want to spend a nice quiet Christmas in the country. Doc and Sprocket have arrived when Fozzie and the other Muppets enter, disrupting Emily and Doc's plans for the holidays. Just then, Miss Piggy calls to tell Kermit the Frog that she is at a photo session and will be late, making Kermit very worried.

Rowlf the Dog and the Swedish Chef arrive, and they begin to prepare for Christmas. Meanwhile, Fozzie builds a snowman outside and the snowman comes to life singing along with Fozzie and putting on a comedy act with him. After the performance, Fozzie goes into the house where he tells Kermit about his new act. This is interrupted by Miss Piggy calling again, when she tells Kermit that she is doing a little Christmas shopping before she goes to the farmhouse.

Sometime later, the gang watches a home movie of themselves as babies during their first Christmas together.

A group of carolers then arrive consisting of Big Bird and the rest of the Sesame Street Muppets. All the Muppets continue to prepare for Christmas as the news comes on TV. The Muppet Newsman reports that the worst blizzard in 50 years is approaching the area. Kermit realizes that Miss Piggy is out in the storm and gets more worried about her.

Fozzie and Emily go over where everyone is going to sleep. Big Bird and Cookie Monster will sleep in the attic, Herry Monster will sleep in the bathtub, and Ernie and Bert will bunk with Kermit. The Sesame Street Muppets perform a pageant of 'Twas the Night Before Christmas where the Two-Headed Monster portrays Santa Claus. Kermit then gets a third call from Piggy stating that her limo got stuck in the snow and that she is calling for a taxi. Fozzie approaches Kermit stating that now is a good time to show him his new comedy act with the Snowman, but their act is cut short no thanks to Statler and Waldorf who are friends with Emily.

Feeling some sympathy for Kermit, Doc offers to go out looking for Piggy. Kermit is called to the basement, where he and his nephew Robin find a Fraggle Hole and the Fraggles.

Finally, after Piggy makes her grand entrance, riding a dogsled with Doc, all the Muppets sing a medley of carols and swap presents (except Oscar the Grouch, who just sits in his trash can, sighing very miserably due to his hatred of Christmas). Doc then comes in dressed as Santa giving presents to the Muppets.

The last part shows Jim Henson himself making a cameo appearance preparing to wash and dry the dishes with Sprocket. Meanwhile, Kermit and Piggy kiss under the mistletoe and wishing the home audience a Merry Christmas. Then the end credits  roll.

Songs
 "We Need a Little Christmas"
 "Jingle Bells"
 "Jingle Bell Rock"
 "Sleigh Ride"
 "Santa Claus Is Coming to Town"
 "Here We Come A-Caroling"
 "Deck the Halls"
 "The Christmas Song"
 "Pass It On" from Fraggle Rock
 "Home for the Holidays"
 Carol Sing Medley
 "Happy Holidays"
 "Ding Dong Merrily on High"
 "I Saw Three Ships"
 "Good King Wenceslas"
 "The Holly and the Ivy"
 "I'll Be Home for Christmas"
 "Happy Holidays" (reprise)
 "Have Yourself a Merry Little Christmas"
 "Caroling, Caroling"
 "I Heard the Bells on Christmas Day"
 "It's in Every One of Us" from John Denver and the Muppets: A Christmas Together
 "Together at Christmas (Old Friends, New Friends)" from The Christmas Toy
 "We Wish You a Merry Christmas"

Cast
 Gerry Parkes as Jerome "Doc" Crystal
 Jim Henson as Himself

Muppet performers
 Jim Henson as Kermit the Frog, Rowlf the Dog, Dr. Teeth, The Swedish Chef, Waldorf, The Muppet Newsman, Ernie, Guy Smiley, Baby Kermit, and Baby Rowlf
 Frank Oz as Miss Piggy, Fozzie Bear, Animal, Sam the Eagle, Bert, Grover, Cookie Monster, Baby Piggy, Baby Fozzie, and Baby Animal
 Jerry Nelson as Robin the Frog, Emily Bear, Floyd Pepper, Count von Count, Camilla the Chicken, Herry Monster, Two-Headed Monster (Left Head), and Gobo Fraggle
 Richard Hunt as Scooter, Janice, Statler, Beaker, Kathleen the Cow, Two-Headed Monster (Right Head), Snowman, and Baby Scooter
 Dave Goelz as Gonzo the Great, Dr. Bunsen Honeydew, Zoot, Beauregard, Boober Fraggle, Uncle Traveling Matt, and Baby Gonzo
 Steve Whitmire as Rizzo the Rat, Lips, Wembley Fraggle, Sprocket the Dog, and Christmas Turkey
 Caroll Spinney as Big Bird and Oscar the Grouch
 Kathryn Mullen as Mokey Fraggle
 Karen Prell as Red Fraggle and Maureen the Mink
 David Rudman as Miss Piggy's Photographer (voice)

Production
This is one of the very few Muppet productions to feature Muppets associated with all four of the major Muppet franchises as a crossover: The Muppet Show, Sesame Street, Fraggle Rock and Muppet Babies (who are seen as actual puppets here instead of animated counterparts). This special also features an onscreen guest cameo by Jim Henson; he can be seen in the kitchen doing dishes with Sprocket towards the end of the special. In addition, the United Kingdom broadcast which aired on BBC One on 26 December 1989, marked the first appearance of Doc on British television, as the UK version of Fraggle Rock featured new "Outer Space" segments, in which Sprocket's owner was a lighthouse keeper.

Scenes omitted in North American DVD and VHS release
A Muppet Family Christmas has never been released in its entirety on either VHS or DVD in North America. Several songs were licensed specially to only air on TV, and thus had to be cut from home video versions.

 The original opening title (superimposed over a shot of Emily Bear's house).
 The snowman and Fozzie's comedy act while singing the song "Sleigh Ride" when hearing Rowlf inside playing the piano.
 The home movie featuring Kermit the Frog, Miss Piggy, Fozzie, Gonzo and Scooter as babies singing "Santa Claus Is Coming to Town" with baby Rowlf playing a toy piano.
 The Muppets sing "Home for the Holidays", after Miss Piggy's grand belated arrival, then later "Have Yourself a Merry Little Christmas" and "I Heard the Bells on Christmas Day" during the final medley.
 A brief shot of Fozzie Bear and Elmo lighting a Christmas tree.
 Fozzie tells his mother, Emily Bear, that he is too old to have a stocking hung for him, then changes his mind.

Reception
A Muppet Family Christmas ranked 24th out of 69 shows in the Nielsen ratings the week it aired, with a 16.1 rating and a 25 share, and was watched by around 19.3 million viewers.

TV Guide ranked the special at number six on its '10 Best Family Holiday Specials' list. In his coverage of the special for The A.V. Club, Myles McNutt stated that A Muppet Family Christmas is "a love letter to the Muppets as a wide-ranging, meaningful part of viewers’ childhoods." He further praised the special's emphasis on family and the Muppet characters over "cheap celebrity cameos." Sean Edgar of Paste described the special as "a grand culmination of the altruism that stands at the foundation of Henson’s oeuvre."

See also
 List of Christmas films

References

External links

 The Official Website
 

Christmas television specials
American Broadcasting Company television specials
1987 television specials
The Muppets television specials
Fraggle Rock
Sesame Street
Crossover television
Television shows written by Jerry Juhl
American Christmas television specials
Films scored by Eric Robertson (composer)